Sar Takaltu (also Romanized as Sar Takaltū; also known as Sar Taktalū) is a village in Zu ol Faqr Rural District, Sarshiv District, Saqqez County, Kurdistan Province, Iran. The 2006 census recorded that the village had a population of 317, made up of 56 families. The majority of residents are Kurds.

References 

Towns and villages in Saqqez County
Kurdish settlements in Kurdistan Province